, provisional designation , is a trans-Neptunian object and binary system from the classical Kuiper belt, located in the outermost region of the Solar System. It was discovered by American astronomer Marc Buie at Kitt Peak Observatory on 7 November 2002.

Physical properties 

The object belongs to the cold classical population and is a binary. The companion was discovered by Keith Noll, Will Grundy, Susan Benecchi, and Hal Levison using Hubble Space Telescope on 21 September 2008. The discovery was announced on 24 September 2009. The Johnston's archive estimates a mean-diameter of 251 km for the primary, and 205 km for the satellite based on a secondary-to-primary diameter ratio of 0.817.

 shows significant photometric variability with the lightcurve amplitude of 0.21. This may indicate that  binary is a result of a collision.

References

External links 
 Asteroids and TNOs with Satellites, Robert Johnston, johnstonsarchive.net
 
 

508869
508869
508869
20021107